Toveybeh-ye Sheykh Hatam (also Romanized as Ţoveybeh-ye Sheykh Ḩātam; also known as Ţove'ībeh) is a village in Jahad Rural District, Hamidiyeh District, Ahvaz County, Khuzestan Province, Iran. At the 2006 census, its population was 185, in 41 families.

References 

Populated places in Ahvaz County